Feel Sorry for the Fanatic is the third album by the German death metal band, Morgoth. It was released in 1996 by Century Media.

Track listing
All songs written by Morgoth
 "This Fantastic Decade"
 "Last Laugh"
 "Cash..."
 "...and Its Amazing Consequences"
 "Curiosity"
 "Forgotten Days"
 "Souls on a Pleasuretrip"
 "Graceland"
 "Watch the Fortune Wheel"
 "A New Start"

The Japanese Version has "Indifferent" as bonus track.

Credits 
 Marc Grewe: Vocals
 Harald Busse: Guitars / Additional Keyboards
 Carsten Otterbach: Guitars
 Sebastian Swart:  Bass
 Rüdiger Hennecke: Drums / Additional Keyboards
 Carsten Achtelik: Keyboards
 Recorded at Woodhouse Studios Hagen
 Produced by Dirk Draeger
 Engineered by Siggi Bemm

 Art direction and design by
 Fabian Richter - Artcore

References 

Morgoth (band) albums
1996 albums